Sant'Onofrio is a comune (municipality) in the Province of Vibo Valentia in the Italian region Calabria, located about  southwest of Catanzaro and about  northeast of Vibo Valentia. It is named after Saint Onuphrius.

Sant'Onofrio borders the following municipalities: Filogaso, Maierato, Pizzo, Stefanaconi, Vazzano, Vibo Valentia.

Demographic evolution

Surnames
10 most common names in Sant'Onofrio.
1. Cugliari
2. De Fina
3. Barbieri
4. Lopreiato
5. Marcello
6. Arcella
7. Pezzo
8. Figliano
9. Marago'
10. Defina
11. Virdo'
12. D'Urzo

References

Cities and towns in Calabria